"Simple Simon" is an English language nursery rhyme. It has a Roud Folk Song Index number of 19777.

Lyrics

The rhyme is as follows;

Simple Simon met a pieman,
Going to the fair;
Says Simple Simon to the pieman,
Let me taste your ware.

Said the pieman unto Simon,
Show me first your penny;
Says Simple Simon to the pieman,
Indeed I have not any.

Simple Simon went a-fishing, 
For to catch a whale;
All the water he had got,
Was in his mother's pail.

Simple Simon went to look
If plums grew on a thistle;
He pricked his fingers very much,
Which made poor Simon whistle.

He went for water in a sieve
But soon it all fell through
And now poor Simple Simon
Bids you all adieu!

Origins
The verses used today are the first of a longer chapbook history first published in 1764. The character of Simple Simon may have been in circulation much longer, possibly appearing in an Elizabethan chapbook and in a ballad, Simple Simon's Misfortunes and his Wife Margery's Cruelty, from about 1685.  Another possible inspiration was Simon Edy, a beggar in the St Giles area in the 18th century.

Notes

External links
A page containing the full text of the rhyme

Year of song unknown
Chapbooks
English nursery rhymes
English folk songs
English children's songs
Traditional children's songs
Songs about fictional male characters